and  are separate Japanese given names used for females or males, though they can be romanized the same way when vowel length is not transliterated.

Possible spellings of Yuki include 雪, 幸, 由紀, 由貴, 由岐, 由樹, 友紀, 夕希  and 有希. Possible spellings of Yūki include 勇気, 有機, 祐樹, 雄輝 and 雄樹.

Notable people named Yuki
Yuki Baba (馬場雄基, born 1992), Japanese politician
, Japanese javelin thrower
, Japanese badminton player
, Japanese judoka
, better known as Satsuki Yukino, Japanese voice actress
, Japanese sport wrestler
, Japanese volleyball player
, Japanese volleyball player
, Japanese film director and illustrator
, Japanese voice actress and radio personality
, Japanese composer and music producer
, Japanese idol and singer
, Japanese wife of Pierpont Morgan's nephew
, Japanese Paralympic athlete
 Yuki Kato (actress) (born 1995), Indonesian actress
, Japanese artist
, Japanese volleyball player
Yuki Kihara (born 1975), Samoan artist
, better known as Yukipoyo, Japanese model and television personality
, Japanese mangaka
, Japanese cross-country skier
, Japanese manga artist
, Japanese academic
, Japanese pop singer
, better known as YUKI, Japanese singer
, Japanese manga artist and illustrator
, Japanese enka singer
, Japanese actress
, Japanese voice actress
, Japanese voice actress
, Japanese actress
, Japanese voice actress
, Japanese manga artist
, Japanese women's basketball player
, Japanese diver
, Japanese voice actress
, Japanese biathlete
, Japanese heptathlete
, Japanese goalball player
, Japanese actress
, Japanese painter
, Japanese photographer
, Japanese singer-songwriter, actress, writer and poet
, Japanese softball player
, Japanese actress
, Japanese manga artist
, Japanese manga artist
, Japanese windsurfer
, Japanese team handball player
, Japanese film director and screenwriter
, Japanese volleyball player
, Japanese shogi player
Yuki Tsubota (born 1994), Canadian freestyle skier
, Japanese actress, idol, singer and model
, Japanese artistic gymnast
, Japanese manga artist
, Japanese announcer
, Japanese judoka

Other people
Yuki Bhambri (born 1992), Indian tennis player
Yuki Hsu (born 1978), Taiwanese pop singer
Yuki Ip, Hong Kong opera singer

Fictional characters
, a character in the video game The Idolmaster Cinderella Girls
, a character in the manga series Whistle!
, a character in the anime series Aldnoah.Zero
, a character in the manga series Momokuri
, a character in the manga series Interviews with Monster Girls
, a character in the anime series Space Battleship Yamato
, a character in the light novel series The Melancholy of Haruhi Suzumiya
Yuki Ōyama, a character in the webcomic Ménage à 3
, a character in the video game A3!
, a character in the manga series Fruits Basket
, a character in the 2000 Megatokyo webcomic
, a character in the manga series School-Live!
, a character in the tokusatsu series Battle Fever J
, a character in the manga series Ceres, Celestial Legend
, a character in the manga series Horimiya
Yuki, Otakuthon mascot

Notable people named Yūki
Yuhki (keyboardist), a keyboard player of Japanese metal band Galneryus
Yuuki (keyboardist), a keyboard player of Japanese group An Cafe
, Japanese footballer
, Japanese footballer
, Japanese footballer
, Japanese footballer
, Japanese ten-pin bowler
, Japanese actress
, Japanese footballer
, Japanese-American musician
, Japanese sumo wrestler
, Japanese kickboxer
, Japanese footballer
, Japanese shogi player
, Japanese footballer
, Japanese footballer
, Japanese footballer
, Japanese footballer
, Japanese actor and model
, Japanese prosecutor
, Japanese women's footballer
 Yuki Goto (singer, born 1986), rapper of the Japanese group EE Jump
, Japanese motorcycle racer
, Japanese footballer
, Japanese footballer
, Japanese shogi player
, Japanese baseball player
, Japanese footballer
, Japanese long jumper
, Japanese footballer
, Japanese footballer
, Japanese archer
, Japanese composer and music arranger
, Japanese comedian
, Japanese footballer
, Japanese footballer
, Japanese footballer
, Japanese footballer
, Japanese footballer
, Japanese swimmer
, Japanese footballer
, Japanese actor
, Japanese footballer
, Japanese golfer
, Japanese footballer
, Japanese footballer
, Japanese volleyball player
, Japanese actor and musician
, Japanese classical cellist
, Japanese motorcyclist
, Japanese ski jumper
, Japanese snowboarder
, Japanese water polo player
, Japanese footballer
, Japanese voice actor
, Japanese footballer
, Japanese footballer
, Japanese manga artist and illustrator
, Japanese voice actress
, Japanese footballer
, Japanese footballer
, Japanese badminton player
, Japanese baseball player
, Japanese kickboxer
, Japanese footballer
, Japanese footballer
, Japanese footballer
, Japanese archer
, Japanese marathon runner
, Japanese speed skater
, Japanese footballer
, Japanese footballer
, Japanese footballer
, Japanese footballer
, Japanese footballer
, Japanese swimmer
, Japanese sprinter
, Japanese footballer
, Japanese idol, actor and singer
, Japanese mixed martial artist
, Japanese footballer
, Japanese footballer
, Japanese baseball player
, Japanese actor and model
, Japanese actress and singer
, Japanese baseball player
, Japanese pianist and composer
, Japanese footballer
, Japanese footballer
, Japanese voice actress
, Japanese footballer
, Japanese footballer
, Japanese voice actor
, Japanese voice actor
, Japanese baseball player
, Japanese footballer
, Japanese footballer
, Japanese hurdler
, Japanese actor
, Japanese swimmer
, Japanese model and gravure idol
, Japanese basketball player
, Japanese actress
, Japanese footballer
, Japanese footballer
, Japanese footballer
, Japanese footballer
, Japanese women's footballer
, Japanese tennis player
, Japanese mixed martial artist and sport wrestler
, Japanese footballer
, Japanese footballer
, Japanese racing driver
, Japanese footballer
, Japanese baseball pitcher
, Japanese figure skater
, Japanese footballer
, Japanese footballer
, Japanese actor
, Japanese footballer
, Japanese actor
, Japanese baseball player
, Japanese footballer
, Japanese footballer
, Japanese footballer
, Japanese footballer
, Japanese footballer
, Japanese footballer
, Japanese footballer
, Japanese voice actor
, Japanese professional wrestler
, Japanese motorcycle racer
, Japanese footballer
, Japanese fencer
, Japanese footballer
, Japanese musician
, Japanese footballer
, Japanese baseball player
, Japanese baseball player
, Japanese footballer
, Japanese footballer
, Japanese actor
, Japanese skeleton racer
, Japanese shogi player
, Japanese long-distance runner
, Japanese footballer
, Japanese voice actor
, Japanese professional wrestler
, Japanese curler
, Japanese baseball player
, Japanese footballer
, Japanese mixed martial artist
, Japanese volleyball player
, Japanese manga artist
, Japanese voice actor
, Japanese footballer
, Japanese voice actress
, Japanese motorcycle racer
, Japanese baseball player
, Japanese sport wrestler
, Japanese long-distance runner
, Japanese footballer
, Japanese footballer
, Japanese tennis player
, Japanese footballer
, Japanese sumo wrestler
, Japanese basketball player
, Japanese voice actor
, Japanese footballer
, Japanese racing driver
, Japanese footballer
, Japanese footballer
, Japanese actor
, Japanese darts player
, Japanese sprinter
, Japanese footballer
, Japanese fashion model
, Japanese footballer
, Japanese racewalker
, Japanese footballer
, Japanese baseball player
, Japanese rugby union player
, Japanese idol and actress
, Japanese baseball player

Fictional characters
, a character in the anime series Go! Princess PreCure
, a character in the manga series Legendz
, a character in the anime series Chance Pop Session
, a character in the manga series Vampire Knight
, a character in the light novel series Sword Art Online
, a character in the visual novel To Heart 2
, a character in the manga series Hikaru no Go
, a character in the manga series No Bra
, a character in the light novel series The Testament of Sister New Devil
, a character in the anime series Tokyo Magnitude 8.0
, a character in the anime series Sky Girls
Yuuki Shibayama (芝山 優生), a character in the anime series Haikyu!!
, a character in the video game series BlazBlue
 

Japanese unisex given names